The Unauthorized Melrose Place Story is a 2015 television drama film directed by Mark Griffiths and written by Dana Schmalenberg. The film stars Ciara Hanna, Frank Rose Bailey IV, Ryan Bruce, Chloe McClay, Chelsea Hobbs, Joseph John Coleman and Brandon Barash. The film premiered on Lifetime on October 10, 2015.

Premise
The film centers around the cast, creation and back story of the 1992-1999 TV series.

Cast
Ciara Hanna as Heather Locklear
Frank Rose Bailey IV as Andrew Shue
Ryan Bruce as Grant Show
Chloe McClay as Josie Bissett
Chelsea Hobbs as Laura Leighton
Joseph John Coleman as Doug Savant
Brandon Barash as Thomas Calabro
Brendan Beiser as Frank South
Peter Benson as Chuck Pratt
Dan Castellaneta as Aaron Spelling
Ali Cobrin as Daphne Zuniga
Rebecca Dalton as Courtney Thorne-Smith
Michael Patrick Denis as Lucas Miller
Lini Evans as Candy Spelling
Angela Galanopoulos as Susan Edelman
Steven Jeays as Steve
Ryan Kennedy as Larry
Adam Korson as Darren Star
Lanie McAuley as Amy Locane
Bri Neal as Bri
Iris Paluly as Merry Donner
Abby Ross as Tori Spelling
Madison Smith as Stephen Dale
Karissa Tynes as Rhonda Blair / Vanessa A. Williams
Teagan Vincze as Marcia Cross

References

External links
 

2015 television films
2015 films
Canadian films based on actual events
2015 drama films
American drama television films
Lifetime (TV network) films
Films shot in British Columbia
Canadian drama television films
Films set in 1992
Beverly Hills, 90210 (franchise)
2010s English-language films
Films directed by Mark Griffiths (director)
2010s Canadian films
2010s American films
English-language Canadian films